Choqa Kabud or Cheqa Kabud or Chaqa Kabud or Choqakabud may refer to various places in Iran:
 Choqa Kabud, Ilam
 Choqa Kabud, Kermanshah
 Choqa Kabud, Mahidasht, Kermanshah Province
 Cheqa Kabud, Eslamabad-e Gharb, Kermanshah Province
 Choqa Kabud, Harsin, Kermanshah Province
 Choqa Kabud-e Olya, Kermanshah Province
 Choqa Kabud-e Sofla, Kermanshah Province
 Cheqa Kabud-e Naqd Ali, Kermanshah Province